Carlos Alvarez (born November 12, 1990) is an American soccer coach and former professional player who played as a midfielder. As of 2022, he works as a youth coach for San Diego Surf SC.

Youth and college career
Alvarez was born in Los Angeles, California on November 12, 1990. He attended Bishop Mora Salesian High School in Los Angeles, where he played soccer. He then continued to University of Connecticut, where he continued his soccer career.  He majored in Spanish.

Club creer

Major League Soccer
Alvarez was selected as the second overall pick in the 2013 MLS SuperDraft by Chivas USA. On March 17, 2013, Alvarez debuted for Chivas USA in Major League Soccer against local-rivals, Los Angeles Galaxy, at the Home Depot Center, in which he came in as a half-time substitute for José Erick Correa, and scored the game-tying goal even though Chivas USA had only 10 men.

On July 1, 2014, Alvarez was traded to Colorado Rapids in exchange for Nathan Sturgis.

Lower divisions
On February 2, 2016, Alvarez was announced as the first-ever signing by San Antonio FC.

On March 23, 2017, Alvarez was announced as the first-ever signing by Los Angeles FC, but was waived by the club before their inaugural season in 2018.

Alvarez was signed by Loudoun United on July 17, 2019 for the remainder of the 2019 USL season, and scored his only goal for the club on August 9, 2019 in Loudoun's Segra Field opener.

On February 8, 2020, Alvarez joined San Diego Loyal.

Coaching career 
Following his retirement from professional football, Alvarez began his coaching career, joining San Diego Surf SC.

Personal life
Born in the United States, Alvarez is of Mexican descent. Alvarez is married to Renae Cuéllar, also a soccer player, who plays for Tijuana and the Mexico women's national team. They have a son, Romeo, who was born in April 2017. Alvarez's brother Efraín is also a professional soccer player for the Los Angeles Galaxy.

References

External links 
 
 UConn profile

1990 births
Living people
UConn Huskies men's soccer players
Chivas USA players
Colorado Rapids players
Charlotte Independence players
San Antonio FC players
Los Angeles FC players
Orange County SC players
Las Vegas Lights FC players
Loudoun United FC players
San Diego Loyal SC players
American sportspeople of Mexican descent
Association football midfielders
Soccer players from Los Angeles
Chivas USA draft picks
Major League Soccer players
USL Championship players
American soccer players
Salesian High School (Los Angeles) alumni